Charles Sherlock Fillmore (August 22, 1854 – July 5, 1948) founded Unity, a church within the New Thought movement, with his wife, Myrtle Page Fillmore, in 1889. He became known as an American mystic for his contributions to spiritualist interpretations of Biblical Scripture.

Biography
Fillmore was born in St. Cloud, Minnesota on August 22, 1854.

An ice skating accident when he was ten broke Fillmore's hip and left him with lifelong disabilities.  In his early years, despite little formal education, he studied William Shakespeare, Lord Tennyson, Ralph Waldo Emerson and Charles Lowell as well as works on spiritualism, Eastern religions, and metaphysics.

He met his future wife, Mary Caroline "Myrtle" Page, in Denison, Texas in the mid-1870s.  After losing his job there, he moved to Gunnison, Colorado where he worked in mining and real estate.

He married Myrtle in Clinton, Missouri on  March 29, 1881. The newlyweds moved to Pueblo, Colorado, where Charles established a real estate business with the brother-in-law of Nona L. Brooks, who later founded the Church of Divine Science.

Introduction to New Thought
After the births of their first two sons, Lowell Page Fillmore and Waldo Rickert Fillmore, the family moved to Kansas City, Missouri. Two years later, in 1886, Charles and Myrtle attended New Thought classes held by E. B. Weeks. Myrtle subsequently recovered from chronic tuberculosis and attributed her recovery to her use of prayer and other methods learned in Weeks's classes. Subsequently, Charles began to heal from his childhood accident, a development which he too attributed to following this philosophy. Charles Fillmore became a devoted student of philosophy and religion.

In 1889, Charles  and Myrtle began publication of a new periodical, Modern Thought, notable among other things as the first publication to accept for publication the writings of the then 27-year-old New Thought pioneer William Walker Atkinson.  In 1890, they announced a prayer group that was later called 'Silent Unity'. In 1891, Fillmore's Unity magazine was first published. H. Emilie Cady published "Lessons in Truth" in the new magazine. This material was later compiled and published in a book by the same name, which served as a seminal work of the Unity Church. Although Charles had no intention of making Unity into a denomination, his students wanted a more organized group. He and his wife were among the first ordained Unity ministers in 1906. Charles and Myrtle Fillmore operated the Unity organizations from a campus near downtown Kansas City.

Death
Myrtle Fillmore died in 1931. Charles remarried in 1933 to Cora G. Dedrick, who was a collaborator on his later writings.  Charles Fillmore died in 1948. Unity continued, growing into a worldwide movement. Unity World Headquarters at Unity Village and Unity Worldwide Ministries are the organizations of the movement.

Tenets and beliefs

In a pamphlet called "Answers to Your Questions About Unity", poet James Dillet Freeman says that Charles and Myrtle both had health problems and turned to some new ideas which they believed helped to improve these problems.  Their beliefs are centered on two basic propositions: (1) God is good. (2) God is available; in fact, God is in you. The pamphlet goes on to say that:
About a year after the Fillmores started the magazine Modern Thought, they had the inspiration that if God is what they thought – the principle of love and intelligence, the source of all good – God is wherever needed. It was not necessary for people to be in the same room with them in order for them to unite in thought and prayer.

The Fillmores taught reincarnation. In his later years, Fillmore felt so young that he thought that he might be physically immortal, as well as believing that he might be the reincarnation of Paul the Apostle. Charles and Myrtle Fillmore were vegetarians. Charles Fillmore wrote ”The master on the spiritual plane is not a slave driver…He must love every creature…His love must flow forth in protecting streams when any creature is in danger of violence or destruction. He must recognize all life as God’s life…Thus he cannot in any way sanction the killing of animals for food, nor can he give passive assent by eating the flesh of those slain by the hands of ignorant man.”

Books 
Christian Healing (1909)
Talks on Truth (1922)
The Twelve Powers of Man (1930)
Metaphysical Bible Dictionary (1931)
Mysteries of Genesis (1936)
Prosperity (1936)
Jesus Christ Heals (1939)
Teach Us to Pray with Cora Fillmore (1941)
Mysteries of John (1946)
Atom-Smashing Power of Mind (1949)
Keep a True Lent (1953)
The Revealing Word (1959
Booklet

 The Last Enemy. (1903) 
 As to Meat Eating. (1903) 
 Unity Statement of Faith. (1921) 
 Love. (1903) 
 A Fuller Awakening To the Christ Truth. (1923) 
 Thought and Mind. (1902) 
 Metaphysical Law of I AM. (1918) 
 The Great Supper. (1901) 
 Paul is Now Here. (1924) 
 The Mystical Power of Love. (1903) 
 The Prosperity Thought. (1905) 
 Prosperity Treatment.  (1904) 
 What Is It That Heals. (1924) 
 Obedience To Divine Law. (1924) 
 Drugs and Microbes. (1905) 
 What the Eye Represents. (1905) 
 Get Still. (1906) 
 First Steps in Regeneration: An Explanatory Lesson given in a Series of Lessons on The development of consciousness. (1912) 
 Evolution: An Explanatory Lesson given in a Series of Lessons on The development of consciousness (1926) 
 Spiritual Consciousness: An Explanatory Lesson given in a Series of Lessons on The Development of Consciousness. (1923) 
 The Church of Christ. (1906) 
 The Unity of Religion and Therapeutics in the New Thought. (1904) 
 John the Baptist States of Mind. (1906) 
 The Real and the Unreal. (1906) 
 In the Name of the Lord. (1906) 
 The Invisible Resource. (1906) 
 Spiritual Obedience. (1906) 
 The idea God and the True God. (1906) 
 Thee Dawn of a new Day. (1906) 
 The Changeless Substance. (1907) 
 The Power of Jesus’ Words. (1907) 
 Order Is Heaven's First Law:An Explanatory Lesson given in a Series of Lessons on Divine Law. (1924) 
 Practical Christianity:An Explanatory Lesson given in a Series of Lessons on The Science of Being and Christian Healing. (1907)
 Continuance in the Word. (1908) 
 The Real meaning of Easter. (1908) 
 The Resurrection. (1908)

See also
 Malinda Cramer
 Emmet Fox
 Ernest Holmes
 Emma Curtis Hopkins
 List of New Thought denominations and independent centers
 List of New Thought writers

References

External links

 Charles Fillmore's works online
 Charles Fillmore
 Read some of Charles Fillmore's books in an easy-to-view format

New Thought clergy
New Thought mystics
New Thought writers
American Christian mystics
American spiritual writers
1854 births
1948 deaths
19th-century Christian mystics
20th-century Christian mystics
Founders of new religious movements
Unity Church
People from St. Cloud, Minnesota